Payyannur College is a government aided college located at Edat village in Payyannur, Kerala, India, which is affiliated to Kannur University under Payyanur Educational Society.

Notable alumni
 K. C. Venugopal
 M. K. Raghavan
 T. V. Rajesh
 John Brittas
 P. Kunhikrishnan
 V. P. Balagangadharan
 V. P. Krishnakumar
 N. Prabhakaran
 Satheesh Babu Payyannur
 A. C. Sreehari
 M. Vijin
 T. I. Madusoodhanan
 Ganapathi S Poduval

Courses
M.Sc. Mathematics
M.Sc. Chemistry
M.Sc. Physics
M.Sc. Plant Science
M.A. English
B.A. English
B.A. Economics
B.A Malayalam
B.A. Hindi
B.A. History
B.A. Politics
B.A. Functional Hindi
B.Sc Chemistry
B.Sc Mathematics
B.Sc Zoology
B.Sc Physics
B.Sc Botany
B.Com. Finance 
BBA

Sports
Their football team participates in Kerala district leagues, with best result of reaching Kerala Premier League through qualifiers.

See also
 Krishna Menon Women's College
 Kannur University
 Sir Syed College

References

Colleges in Kerala
Colleges affiliated to Kannur University
Arts and Science colleges in Kerala
Educational institutions established in 1965
1965 establishments in Kerala
Universities and colleges in Kannur district
Educational institutions in India with year of establishment missing